Max Purcell (born 3 April 1998) is an Australian professional tennis player.

He reached his career-high doubles ranking of world No. 25 in April 2022, and has won two titles on the ATP Tour, finishing runner-up on four further occasions. In singles, his highest ranking is world No. 95, achieved on 6 March 2023. 

He won his first Grand Slam title at the 2022 Wimbledon Championships in doubles alongside Matthew Ebden. The pair also finished runners-up at the 2022 Australian Open, and Purcell previously reached the final at the 2020 Australian Open with Luke Saville. Purcell also reached the mixed doubles semifinals at the 2021 US Open with Dayana Yastremska. He represented Australia in both disciplines at the 2020 Olympic Games, partnering John Peers in doubles.

Professional career

2016–2019: Early career
In July 2016, Purcell qualified for and won the Gimcheon Challenger in South Korea against fellow Australian Andrew Whittington. Purcell was ranked No. 762 in the world leading into the tournament, making him the second lowest-ranked player to win an ATP Challenger title in 16 years. He finished the season ranked 324 in the world.

In 2017, Purcell received a wildcard into the Australian Open doubles event, where he partnered Alex de Minaur. The duo lost in the opening round to Spanish pairing Guillermo García López and Pablo Carreño Busta. Purcell made four Futures Tour finals in 2017, claiming three titles. He finished the year ranked No. 277 in the world.

2020: Grand Slam singles debut and Australian Open doubles final
In January, Purcell made his Grand Slam singles debut after qualifying for the 2020 Australian Open. He lost to Jannik Sinner in the first round in straight sets. At the same tournament, he paired with Luke Saville as a wildcard in the Men's doubles, where they reached the final losing to 11th seeded pair American Rajeev Ram and Brit Joe Salisbury. The pair also reached their second final of the season of the 2020 Astana Open where they lost to Belgians Sander Gillé/Joran Vliegen.

2021: Maiden ATP semifinal, Olympics debut and top 30 in doubles
Purcell commenced the 2021 season at the 2021 Great Ocean Road Open, where he defeated Norbert Gombos for his first ATP main draw win. Purcell was defeated by Karen Khachanov in the second round.

Purcell earned his first win against an opponent in the top 20 after beating World No. 16 and top seed Gaël Monfils at the Eastbourne International as a lucky loser to reach his first ATP singles quarterfinal and then recorded another win over Andreas Seppi to reach his first semifinal. He lost to another Italian Lorenzo Sonego. Following this great run, in July he won his second Challenger singles title, the 2021 President's Cup (tennis) in Nur Sultan. As a result, he entered the top 200 at a career-high in singles of No. 190 on 19 July 2021.

At the 2020 Tokyo Olympics, Purcell was entered as a last-minute alternate for Andy Murray, who had withdrawn due to a right quad injury. Purcell recorded his biggest career win and first over a top 20 player, defeating world no. 15 Félix Auger-Aliassime in straight sets. Purcell also replaced Alex de Minaur after he tested positive for COVID-19 in the doubles event, where he partnered John Peers but lost in the first round.

In August 2021, Purcell reached the third round of the 2021 Winston-Salem Open. He re-entered the ATP top 200 in singles as a result.

He reached the quarterfinals in doubles at the 2021 US Open partnering Matthew Ebden where they lost to 4th seeds and eventual champions Joe Salisbury and Rajeev Ram. He was also selected as a wildcard in the singles main draw for his debut at this Major but lost in the first round again to 13th seed Jannik Sinner.

On 20 September 2021, and following a quarterfinal result at Cary Challenger, Purcell achieved a career high singles ranking of World No. 189. He followed this by a final also in singles at the 2021 Columbus Challenger where he lost to Stefan Kozlov. He reached a career-high singles ranking of No. 175 and doubles ranking of No. 28 on 18 October 2021.

2022: Australian Open final, Wimbledon champion and top 25 in doubles
In January 2022, Purcell made his debut representing Australia at the 2022 ATP Cup, losing to Jannik Sinner in the round robin stage. Purcell attempted to qualify for the Australian Open, but was eliminated in the second round.

In the men's doubles, Purcell partnered once again with Ebden. After defeating Jonathan Erlich and André Göransson in the first round, they went on to topple four seeded teams consecutively en route to Purcell's second men's doubles final and their maiden doubles final as a team overall. In the second round, Ebden and Purcell beat fourth seeds Juan Sebastián Cabal and Robert Farah from a set down before reaching the third round, where they defeated thirteenth seeds Raven Klaasen and Ben McLachlan in straight sets to make the quarterfinals. This showing earned the pair their second Grand Slam quarterfinal appearance together. In the quarterfinals, they knocked out tenth seeds Wesley Koolhof and Neal Skupski from a set down and through the final ten-point deciding set tiebreak to reach the semifinals. Together with Thanasi Kokkinakis and Nick Kyrgios, Ebden and Purcell made it the most Australians to reach this stage of the men's doubles tournament in 29 years, since 1993, and the first time since 1985 that two all-Australian pairings contested the semifinals. Their quarterfinals win set them up for a match against second seeds Rajeev Ram and Joe Salisbury, where they saved four set points in the second set to defeat the pair in straight sets to reach the final. Purcell and Ebden faced Kokkinakis and Kyrgios in the final, the first in men's doubles at the Australian Open to feature two all-Australian teams since 1980, where they ultimately lost in straight sets.

Purcell made his debut at the 2022 Wimbledon Championships in singles after qualifying for the main draw for the first time. In the main draw, he lost to Adrian Mannarino in the first round in five sets.

Seeded 14th in the doubles event, Purcell and Ebden reached their second Major final, defeating third seeds Wesley Koolhof and Neal Skupski in the round of 16, avenging their loss in the final of the 2022 Libéma Open earlier in the grass season, seventh seeds Filip Polasek and John Peers in the quarterfinals and top seeds Joe Salisbury and Rajeev Ram on their way. In the semifinal matchup against Sailsbury and Ram, Purcell and Ebden played in a five sets close to four hours epic match, saving five match points, to reach their second Major final. They went on to win their maiden Grand Slam title as a team defeating second seeded pair of Nikola Mektic and Mate Pavic in another more than four hours, five set classic with a super tiebreak. 

At the 2022 Hall of Fame Open he reached the second round in singles defeating Adrian Mannarino before losing to Andy Murray. At the same tournament he reached the quarterfinals partnering Tim van Rijthoven where they lost to eventual champions William Blumberg and Steve Johnson. At the 2022 Los Cabos Open he qualified for the main draw and defeated Henri Laaksonen before losing to 6th seed Brandon Nakashima. At the same tournament in doubles seeded second with Ebden, they reached also the second round.

At the US Open, Purcell failed to qualify for the singles event. In the doubles, Purcell and Ebden were eliminated in the third round by second seeded pair Wesley Koolhof and Neal Skupski.

Purcell finished the year ranked No. 220 in the world in singles and No. 33 in the world in doubles.

2023: Three Challenger titles & top 100 singles debut 
Despite a successful 2022 doubles campaign, which included two Grand Slam finals and a title, Purcell decided to split from partner Matthew Ebden for the 2023 season, citing a desire to focus on his singles career.

Purcell qualified for the second time at the Australian Open in singles, but was eliminated in the first round of the main draw after a four set loss against Emil Ruusuvuori. Purcell partnered fellow Australian Jordan Thompson in the doubles event, but was eliminated in the second round by eventual finalists Hugo Nys and Jan Zielinski. 

Ranked No. 203, he reached the top 155 in singles following his second Challenger title in Chennai. He moved another 40 positions up to No. 116 on 27 February 2023 after winning his back-to-back title at the 2023 Bengaluru Open Challenger. He moved another 20 positions up to reach the top 100 after his third Challenger title in a month in Pune to No. 95 on 6 March 2023.

Performance timelines

Singles
Current after the 2022 Davis Cup Finals

Doubles
Current after the 2022 Davis Cup Finals

Significant finals

Grand Slam tournament finals

Doubles: 3 (1 title, 2 runners-up)

ATP career finals

Doubles: 6 (2 titles, 4 runners-up)

Team competition finals

Davis Cup: 1 (1 runner-up)

ATP Challenger and ITF Futures finals

Singles: 14 (9–5)

Doubles: 20 (14–6)

Record against top 10 players

Purcell's record against players who have been ranked in the top 10, with those who are active in boldface. Only ATP Tour main draw matches are considered:

References

External links
 
 
 
 

1998 births
Living people
Australian male tennis players
Tennis players at the 2020 Summer Olympics
Tennis players from Sydney
Olympic tennis players of Australia
21st-century Australian people